This list contains all spacewalks performed between 12 May 2000 and 22 October 2014 where an astronaut fully or partially left a spacecraft.

2000–2004 spacewalks

Spacewalk beginning and ending times are given in Coordinated Universal Time (UTC).

2000 spacewalks

2001 spacewalks

2002 spacewalks

2003 spacewalks

2004 spacewalks

2005–2009 spacewalks
Spacewalk beginning and ending times are given in Coordinated Universal Time (UTC).

2005 spacewalks

2006 spacewalks

[[File:STS-116 spacewalk 1.jpg|thumb|center|200px|Robert Curbeam and Christer Fuglesang attach cables to the ISS P3/P4 truss during the second EVA of Discovery'''s STS-116 flight. (2006)]]

2007 spacewalks

2008 spacewalks

2009 spacewalks

2010–2014 spacewalksSpacewalk beginning and ending times are given in Coordinated Universal Time (UTC).2010 spacewalks

2011 spacewalks

2012 spacewalks

2013 spacewalks

2014 spacewalksFor spacewalks that took place from the beginning of 2015 on, see'' List of spacewalks since 2015.

See also
List of spacewalkers
List of cumulative spacewalk records

References

External links
NASA list of EVA statistics (May not be updated)
U. S. Human Spaceflight History
NASA JSC Oral History Project
"Boomers collect artifacts, memories of NASA's heyday": Historical moonwalk information.

Spacewalks and moonwalks
Spacewalks 2000-2014
Spacewalks 2000-2014
Spacewalks 2000-2014
 2000